Emir Abdelkader University of Islamic Sciences (Arabic:جامعة الأمير عبد القادر للعلوم الإسلامية ) is a university in Algeria.

History
The idea of establishing the university along with the Emir Abdelkader Mosque, which accords the university structures of Islamic architecture, has led to the large number of specialists on the subject of Islamic architecture.

Site 
The University of Emir Abdelkader is located in city of Qusanṭīnah, the capital of the east Algerian Constantine province.

References

See also

Articles 
 List of Muslim educational institutions
 List of Islamic Universities

External links 

 Emir Abdelkader University

Buildings and structures in Constantine, Algeria
Universities in Algeria
Islamic universities and colleges